Arizona Colt Returns, also known as Arizona is a 1970 Spaghetti Western film directed by Sergio Martino and starring Anthony Steffen. The feature film debut of Martino after a series of documentary films, it is the sequel of Arizona Colt, with Steffen replacing Giuliano Gemma in the title role and with only Roberto Camardiel reprising his role from the previous film.

Synopsis 
Famed gunman Arizona Colt is living in near-isolation with his friend Double Whiskey. After learning that he has a bounty on his head he decides to go back to town and square things up. Shortly after faking his own death, Arizona is subsequently asked by the wealthy landlord Moreno to rescue his daughter from the grips of Arizona's old enemy, Keene, who was also responsible for framing Arizona and setting him up for the bounty in the first place. Arizona refuses at first, thinking to settle down with the beautiful bartender Sheena. But after his friend Double Whiskey is captured by Keene, Arizona decides to face the challenge. Nevertheless, certain complications make his mission far more dangerous than expected.

Cast

Release
Arizona Colt Returns was released in 1970.

See also 
 List of Italian films of 1970

References

Sources

External links
 

Spaghetti Western films
1970 Western (genre) films
1970 films
Films directed by Sergio Martino
Films scored by Bruno Nicolai
Italian sequel films
Spanish Western (genre) films
1970s Italian films